En fuldendt gentleman is a 1937 Danish family film directed by Lau Lauritzen Jr. and Alice O'Fredericks.

Cast
Osvald Helmuth as Mortensen
Lau Lauritzen Jr. as Baron Henrik Falkenstjerne
Oda Pasborg as Bodil von Hauch
Karen Jønsson as Karen von Hauch
Albrecht Schmidt - Grev Urne
Ellen Margrethe Stein as Grevinde Urne
Eigil Reimers as Grev Tage Urne
Else Jarlbak as Ulla Platen
Thorkil Lauritzen as Kammerjunker Torben von Gothenburg
Erika Voigt as Apoteker Hornfleth
Knud Almar as Inspektør Boye
Alex Zander as Chauffør
Carola Merrild as Stuepige
Henry Nielsen as Frisørkunde
Betty Helsengreen

References

External links

1937 films
1930s Danish-language films
Danish black-and-white films
Films directed by Lau Lauritzen Jr.
Films directed by Alice O'Fredericks